WPDX was a Classic Country formatted broadcast radio station licensed to Clarksburg, West Virginia, serving the Clarksburg/Fairmont/Buckhannon area.  WPDX was last owned by West Virginia Radio Corporation and last operated under their AJG Corporation licensee.

Because it shared the same frequency as "clear channel" station WSB in Atlanta, Georgia, WPDX operated only during daytime hours.

History
WPDX began broadcasting August 17, 1947. The station was licensed to the Clarksburg Broadcasting Corporation and was located at 339 West Main Street in Clarksburg.

On October 13, 2008, WPDX flipped from Adult Standards to Classic Country simulcasting sister station WPDX-FM.

AJG Corporation surrendered WPDX's license to the Federal Communications Commission on December 9, 2021, who cancelled it the same day.

References

External links
FCC History Cards for WPDX (covering 1946-1981)
FCC Station Search Details: DWPDX (Facility ID: 68302)

PDX
Radio stations established in 1947
Radio stations disestablished in 2021
1947 establishments in West Virginia
2021 disestablishments in West Virginia
PDX
Defunct radio stations in the United States
PDX